Ulick Óge Burke, 8th Clanricarde or Mac William Uachtar (died 1520) was an Irish chieftain and noble who was Clanricarde for barely a year.

He was a son of Ulick Fionn Burke, 6th Clanricarde (d.1509) who had been defeated at the Battle of Knockdoe in 1504. Ulick was succeeded by his brother, Richard Mor Burke, 9th Clanricarde (d.1530).

Family tree

   Ulick Ruadh Burke, d. 1485
    |
    |
    |                      |                        |                        |                 |
    |                      |                        |                        |                 |
    Edmund, d. 1486.       Ulick Fionn          Meiler, Abbot of Tuam      John, d. 1508.   Ricard Og, d. 1519.
    |                      |                                                                   |
    |                      |___            |_
    Ricard, d. c. 1517.    |                          |              |            |            |                |
    |                      |                          |              |            |            |                |
    |                   Ulick Óge, d. 1519.  Richard Mór   Redmond   Richard Bacach    Ulick, d. 1551.  Thomas
    John, fl. 1536.                                   |                           |            |                |
                                                      |                           |            |                |
                                                 Ulick na gCeann         Roland, Bp. Clonfert. Thomas Balbh  John of Derrymaclaghtna
                                                      |                         died 1580                       |
                           ___|_                            |
                           |                    |     |               |             |                       Ricard, d. 1593.
                           |                    |     |               |             |                           |
                          Richard Sassanach   John  Thomas Feranta  Edmond   Redmond na Scuab         (Burke of Derrymaclaghtna)
                           | d. 1582.                 d. 1546.                  d. 1596.
                           |
                       Earl of Clanricarde         

 Richard an Fhorbhair de Burgh (d.1343)
 Sir William (Ulick) de Burgh (d. 1343/53), 1st Mac William Uachtar (Upper Mac William) or Clanricarde (Galway)
 Richard Óg Burke (d. 1387), 2nd Clanricarde
 Ulick an Fhiona Burke (d. 1424), 3rd Clanricarde
 Ulick Ruadh Burke (d. 1485), 5th Clanricarde
 Edmund Burke (d. 1466)
 Ricard of Roscam (d. 1517)
 John mac Richard Mór Burke (d. 1536), 10th Clanricarde
 Ulick Fionn Burke (d.1509), 6th Clanricarde
 Ulick Óge Burke (d. 1520), 8th Clanricarde
 Richard Mór Burke (d. 1530), 9th Clanricarde
 Ulick na gCeann Burke (d. 1544), 12th Clanricarde, 1st Earl of Clanricarde (1543)
 Richard Bacach Burke (d. 1538), 11th Clanricarde
 Richard Óge Burke (d. 1519), 7th Clanricarde
 Sir Uilleag Burke (d. 1551), 13th Clanricarde
 William mac Ulick Burke (d. 1430), 4th Clanricarde
 Edmund de Burgh (d. 1410)

References

Further reading
 Burke, Eamon "Burke People and Places", Dublin, 1995.
 A New History of Ireland, IX, p. 172, Oxford, 1984.

People from County Galway
16th-century Irish people
Ulick Oge